Mya Nyein was the Deputy Speaker of the Amyotha Hluttaw, the upper house of Burma's parliament, the Pyidaungsu Hluttaw, elected to the post from 31 January 2011 to 29 January 2016. He was also the chairman of the Bills Committee in the Pyithu Hluttaw (2011–15).

References

Members of the House of Nationalities
People from Yangon Region